Jacob Wipf (1834 – 1910) was a member of the Wisconsin State Assembly.

Biography
Wipf was born on December 15, 1834, in Horgen, Switzerland. During the American Civil War, he served with the 44th Wisconsin Volunteer Infantry Regiment of the Union Army, achieving the rank of sergeant. Events he took part in include the Battle of Nashville.

Political career
Wipf was a member of the Assembly during the 1889 and 1893 sessions. Additionally, he chaired the town board (similar to a city council) and was Town Treasurer of Iola, Wisconsin. He was a Republican. He died on 14 October 1910 in Iola.

References

1834 births
1910 deaths
People from Horgen
People from Iola, Wisconsin
Swiss emigrants to the United States
Republican Party members of the Wisconsin State Assembly
Wisconsin city council members
City and town treasurers in the United States
People of Wisconsin in the American Civil War
Union Army soldiers